California Township is a civil township of Branch County in the U.S. state of Michigan.  The population was 1,040 at the 2010 census.

History
California Township was organized in 1846. It was named after the California Territory.

Communities
There are no incorporated municipalities within the primarily agricultural township. The only concentrated settlements are in two unincorporated communities:
 Ray is situated on the Indiana state border (and is partly within Indiana).

Geography

Demographics
As of the census of 2000, there were 909 people, 274 households, and 204 families residing in the township. There were 294 housing units at an average density of 13.8 per square mile (5.3/km2). The racial makeup of the township was 95.38% White, 1.32% African American, 0.33% Native American, and 2.97% from two or more races. Hispanic or Latino of any race were 0.44% of the population.

There were 274 households, out of which 42.7% had children under the age of 18 living with them, 63.1% were married couples living together, 6.2% had a female householder with no husband present, and 25.2% were non-families. 20.1% of all households were made up of individuals, and 10.2% had someone living alone who was 65 years of age or older.  The average household size was 3.30 and the average family size was 3.87.

In the township the population was spread out, with 40.5% under the age of 18, 9.2% from 18 to 24, 24.3% from 25 to 44, 15.5% from 45 to 64, and 10.5% who were 65 years of age or older.  The median age was 25 years. For every 100 females, there were 109.4 males.  For every 100 females age 18 and over, there were 108.1 males.

The median income for a household in the township was $34,545, and the median income for a family was $38,304. Males had a median income of $27,500 versus $20,833 for females. The per capita income for the township was $11,341.  About 21.3% of families and 31.8% of the population were below the poverty line, including 46.5% of those under age 18 and 26.0% of those age 65 or over.

References

Notes

Sources

Townships in Branch County, Michigan
1846 establishments in Michigan
Townships in Michigan